Maxwell Reed (2 April 1919 – 31 October 1974) was a Northern Irish actor who became a matinee idol in several British films during the 1940s and 1950s.

Biography

Early Years
Reed was born in Larne. He left school aged fifteen to work on ships, including as a blockade runner. He wanted to act and ended up studying at RADA for a year. During World War II he served in the RAF and then the Merchant Navy. After demobilisation he worked as an extra and in repertory. He did a screen test for Riverside Studios at Rank and joined The Company of Youth at the age of 27.

Reed made his film debut in The Years Between (1946) and then appeared in Gaiety George (1946), both in uncredited roles.

Leading Man
Producer Sydney Box thought Reed had star potential and promoted him to leading man status for Daybreak, a film noir which Box produced and co-wrote with his wife Muriel; Reed played an employee of Eric Portman who lusts after Portman's wife, played by Ann Todd. The film was made in 1946, but not released until 1948 because of censorship issues.

Box cast Reed in the lead role in a film made immediately after but released before Daybreak: The Brothers (1947).

Reed followed it with Dear Murderer (1947), from a script by Box, starring Portman, and then he made two films opposite Anne Crawford, Night Beat (1947), and Daughter of Darkness (1948). He had the lead in Streets Paved with Water which was abandoned during filming.

Reed had more of a support role in The Lost People (1949), co-directed by Muriel Box, and Madness of the Heart (1949), with Margaret Lockwood. He had the lead in Blackout (1950), opposite Dinah Sheridan.

Reed had a support role in The Clouded Yellow (1950) with Jean Simmons, then had the lead in some B pictures, The Dark Man (1950) and There Is Another Sun (1951). Reed said in June 1950 that "they tried to make me a star too soon."

Reed moved to the U.S. to make Flame of Araby (1952). He returned to Britain for support parts in Sea Devils (1953) and The Square Ring (1953).

After making Captain Phantom (1953) in Italy, Reed starred in some British B movies, Marilyn (1953), Before I Wake (1955) and The Brain Machine (1956). He appeared in episodes of Theatre Royal had a small role in Helen of Troy (1956).

Hollywood
Reed moved to Hollywood permanently in the late 1950s and guest starred on TV shows like Celebrity Playhouse and The Betty Hutton Show. He landed the title role in the 1950s television series Captain David Grief, based on short stories by Jack London. It ran for two seasons in syndication, and was the first television series made on location in Hawaii; the first nine episodes were shot on Maui before production moved to southern California.

Reed had support roles in films like The Notorious Landlady (1962) and appeared as a guest star in television series such as Bonanza, Kraft Mystery Theater, The Beachcomber, The Lloyd Bridges Show, The Great Adventure, Perry Mason and Daniel Boone.

His last feature film was Picture Mommy Dead (1966).

Personal life
Reed was the first husband of actress Joan Collins, whom he married on 24 May 1952. He is reported to have raped her when dating, but she married him out of shame. They were separated in 1954 and the marriage ended in divorce in 1956, after which Reed sued her for alimony, claiming that he had earned only $1,000 over the previous 12 months. He later withdrew this claim.

He died from cancer in 1974, aged 55, in London.

Filmography

References

External links 
'''
The Forgotten Man: the Films of Maxwell Reed at Britmovie

1919 births
1974 deaths
Male film actors from Northern Ireland
Male television actors from Northern Ireland
Deaths from cancer in England
People from Larne
20th-century male actors from Northern Ireland
Irish emigrants to the United States
Violence against women in the United Kingdom